The magma supply rate measures the production rate of magma at a volcano.

Definitions 

Magma supply rate is also known as the Armstrong unit, where 1 Armstrong Unit = . Armstrong unit can also refer to volcanic flux rate per length of arc in discussions of volcanic arcs, in that case km2/year.

Sometimes in discussion of large volcanic systems such as volcanic arcs the volcanic flux rate is normalized to a surface area, similar to Darcy's law in hydrodynamics. It is often easier to measure magma supply rates when they are normalized for an exposed surface area as it is often difficult to delimit an intrusion.

Measurement difficulties 

Estimating the volcanic flux rate or magma supply of a volcanic system is inherently difficult for a number of reasons, and different measurements can come to different conclusions about the volcanic flux rate of a given volcanic system. Not all volcanic bodies are equally well exposed, and it is often impossible or difficult to measure magma supply rates exactly. Furthermore, volcanic flux rates often vary over time, with distinct lulls and pulses. Wall rocks may be assimilated by magma or magma may undergo differentiation such as crystallization. Magma contains vesicles and volcanic edifices are often eroded. The sizes of volcanic edifices and plutons are difficult to estimate, especially in intrusions which are mostly buried.

Applications 

The magma supply rate is used to infer the behaviour of volcanic systems which erupt periodically, as well as to describe the growth of the continental crust and of deep-seated magmatic bodies such as plutons. Magma output is usually larger in oceanic settings than in continental ones, and basaltic volcanic systems produce more magma than silicic ones.

Table of selected flux rates

References 

Volcanology